Castello di Monteodorisio (Italian for Castle of Monteodorisio)  is a  Middle Ages castle in Monteodorisio, Province of Chieti (Abruzzo).

History

Architecture

References

External links

Monteodorisio
Monteodorisio